James Stuart may refer to:

Government and politics 

 James VI and I (1566–1625), James VI of Scotland and James I of England 
 James II of England (1633–1701), James VII of Scotland
 James Fitz-James Stuart, 2nd Duke of Berwick (1696–1738), Jacobite and Spanish nobleman
 James Fitz-James Stuart, 3rd Duke of Berwick (1718–1787), Jacobite
 James Francis Edward Stuart (1688–1766), "the Old Pretender", claimant to the thrones of England and Scotland
 James Stuart, Duke of Cambridge (1663–1667), second son of the Duke of York and his first wife, Anne Hyde
 James Stuart (1681–1743) (died 1743), British Army officer, courtier and politician, Member of Parliament (MP) for Ayr Burghs 1734–41
 James Stuart (1774–1833), British businessman and politician, director of The East India Company, MP for Huntingdon 1824–31
 James Stuart (1775–1849), Scottish politician
 James Stuart-Wortley (Conservative politician) (1805–1881), British Conservative Party politician
 James Stuart-Wortley (New Zealand politician) (1833–1870)
 James Stuart-Wortley-Mackenzie (1747–1818), Soldier and Member of Parliament (MP) 1768–96
 James Stuart-Wortley, 1st Baron Wharncliffe (1776–1845)
 James Stuart, 1st Viscount Stuart of Findhorn (1897–1971), Conservative Party politician and Secretary of State for Scotland
 Sir James Stuart, 1st Baronet (1780–1853), Lower Canada lawyer, politician, judge

Several Earls of Moray, including

 James Stewart, 1st Earl of Moray (1501 creation) (died 1544), illegitimate son of James IV of Scotland and Janet Kennedy
 James Stewart, 1st Earl of Moray (c. 1531–1570), member of the House of Stewart as the illegitimate son of King James V
 James Stuart, 3rd Earl of Moray (died 1638), son of James Stewart, 2nd Earl of Moray and Elizabeth Stuart, 2nd Countess of Moray
 James Stuart, 4th Earl of Moray (1611–1653), son of James Stuart, 3rd Earl of Moray and Lady Anne Gordon
 James Stuart, 8th Earl of Moray (1708–1767), son of Francis Stuart, 7th Earl of Moray

and several Earls of Bute and their predecessors, including:

 James Stuart, 1st Earl of Bute (died 1710), Scottish soldier, judge, and politician
 James Stuart, 2nd Earl of Bute (died 1723), son of James Stuart, 1st Earl of Bute and Agnes Mackenzie

Military 

 James Stuart (British Army officer, born 1741) (1741–1815), British general in North America and India
 James Stuart (British Army officer, died 1793) (died 1793), British general of the East India Company
 James Ewell Brown Stuart (1833–1864), Confederate States military officer in the American Civil War

Others 

 James Stuart (clergyman) (1701–1789), translator into Scottish Gaelic of the New Testament
 James Stuart (linguist) (1868–1942), civil servant in the Colony of Natal and Zulu linguist
 James Stuart (opera director) (1928–2005), American tenor and opera director
 James Stuart (rugby league) (born 1988), Australian rugby league player
 James Stuart (scientist) (1843–1913), Professor of Mechanism and Applied Mechanics at Cambridge University and Liberal Party politician
 James "Athenian" Stuart (1713–1788), archaeologist and architect
 James Stuart (artist) (1802–1842), quarantine officer, naturalist, and artist
 Jim Stuart (1919–1985), American football player
 James Gibb Stuart (1920–2013), financial author
 James Patrick Stuart (born 1968), American film and television actor
 Stuart James (born 1970), British, Canadian film and television actor

See also 

 James Stewart (disambiguation)
 James Denham-Steuart, British economist
 Jamie Stuart (born 1976), English footballer
 Jamie Stewart (disambiguation)